Theresa Eslund (born 20 July 1986) is a Danish professional footballer who plays as a defender for Brøndby IF in the Danish Elitedivisionen and the Danish national team.

Eslund previously played for Reign FC of the American National Women's Soccer League, Melbourne City of the Australian W-League, and Vålerenga in Norway's Toppserien. She was named Danish Women's Footballer of the Year in 2012.

Early life
Raised in Valby, Eslund began playing football at age six on a team known as Rikken.

Club career

Brøndby IF, 2009–2016
In 2012, Eslund was named Danish Women's Footballer of the Year after helping Brøndby IF to a league and cup double.

Vålerenga, 2017
In January 2017, Eslund signed with Norwegian club, Vålerenga in Oslo, marking her first time playing for a foreign club. Eslund made 22 appearances for Vålerenga and scored two goals during the 2017 season. She scored her first goal for Vålerenga in the 47th minute of a match against Kolbotn resulting in a 2–0 win. The club finished in seventh place with a  record. Eslund was named one of the top 200 players in the world for 2017 by The Offside Rule, a podcast by The Guardian.

Reign FC, 2018–2019
Eslund signed with American side Reign FC ahead of the 2018 National Women's Soccer League season in January 2018. She made her debut for Seattle as a starting defender during the home opener — a 2–1 win over the Washington Spirit on 24 March.

Return to Brøndby IF
Eslund returned to Brøndby IF on a two-year contract in 2020, were the team ended up at second place in the league.

International career

At age 17, Eslund competed with the Denmark's under-17 national team at the 2003 European Youth Summer Olympic Festival. She scored in the final as Denmark beat Switzerland on penalties after a 1–1 draw at Stade Sébastien Charléty in Paris.

Eslund made her senior international debut for Denmark in March 2008, during the team's 1–0 win over Germany at the 2008 Algarve Cup.

She was named to Kenneth Heiner-Møller's squad for UEFA Women's Euro 2013 and she was also part of Danish squad, who received silver at the UEFA Women's Euro 2017 in Netherlands.

Honours 

Brøndby IF
 Elitedivisionen: Winner 2011, 2012, 2013, 2015, 2017 
 Danish Women's Cup: Winner 2010, 2011, 2012, 2013, 2014, 2015, 2017

Denmark
 UEFA Women's Euro 2017 runners-up

Individual
 UEFA Women's Euro 2017 Best XI
 Toppserien Defender of the Year: 2017

Personal
Formerly known as Theresa Nielsen, Eslund began using her married name in 2020.

References

External links

 
 Profile at Danish Football Association
 
 

1986 births
Living people
Danish women's footballers
Denmark women's international footballers
Brøndby IF (women) players
Women's association football defenders
Vålerenga Fotball Damer players
OL Reign players
National Women's Soccer League players
FIFA Century Club
Danish expatriate sportspeople in the United States
Footballers from Copenhagen
UEFA Women's Euro 2017 players